Antwun Echols (born December 4, 1971 in Memphis, Tennessee) is an American boxer who was a world middleweight contender throughout the late 1990s and early 2000s. His hometown is Davenport, Iowa.

Career
Echols turned professional in 1993 and in 1999 challenged IBF middleweight title holder Bernard Hopkins.  Although Echols gave Hopkins a tough fight, he lost via decision.  The following year he lost a rematch with Hopkins, this time losing via TKO in the 10th.  In 2001 he fought a crowd-pleasing bout with Charles Brewer.  Echols went down three times in round two, but recovered in round three to score a TKO win to capture the vacant NABA super middleweight title.  In 2003 Echols got another opportunity for a title shot after the WBA Super Middleweight Title was vacated when Sven Ottke was upgraded to 'Super' champion status.  He battled Anthony Mundine for the vacant title, but lost a close decision.  In 2005, Echols lost an IBF Middleweight Eliminator to Kingsley Ikeke when he was stopped in the tenth round. Since 2005, Echols is 1-16-3, his run as a championship caliber fighter long ended. In his most recent bout in October 2015, Echols was stopped by Derrick Findley in three rounds, the seventh consecutive bout he was stopped in the third round.

Professional boxing record

|-
|align="center" colspan=8|32 Wins (28 knockouts, 4 decisions), 20 Losses (12 knockouts, 7 decisions), 4 Draws 
|-
| align="center" style="border-style: none none solid solid; background: #e3e3e3"|Result
| align="center" style="border-style: none none solid solid; background: #e3e3e3"|Opponent's Record
| align="center" style="border-style: none none solid solid; background: #e3e3e3"|Opponent
| align="center" style="border-style: none none solid solid; background: #e3e3e3"|Type
| align="center" style="border-style: none none solid solid; background: #e3e3e3"|Round
| align="center" style="border-style: none none solid solid; background: #e3e3e3"|Date
| align="center" style="border-style: none none solid solid; background: #e3e3e3"|Location
| align="center" style="border-style: none none solid solid; background: #e3e3e3"|Notes
|-
|Loss
| align=center| 7-0
| align=center|Mike Jimenez
|TKO
| align=center| 3
|21/11/2012
|align=left|Horseshoe Casino Hammond, Hammond, Indiana
|align=left|
|-
|Loss
| align=center| 17-1
| align=center|Patrick Majewski
|TKO
| align=center| 3
|07/04/2012
|align=left|Lander's Center, Southaven, Mississippi
|align=left|
|-
|Loss
| align=center| 22-0-1
| align=center|Marcus Oliveira
|TKO
| align=center| 3
|28/01/2012
|align=left|Menominee Resort Casino, Menominee, Wisconsin
|align=left|
|-
|Loss
| align=center| 31-5
|align=center|Alejandro Berrio
|TKO
| align=center| 3
|26/02/2011
|align=left|Eihusen Arena, Grand Island, Nebraska
|align=left|
|-
|Loss
| align=center| 25-1-2
|align=center|Joe Spina
|TKO
| align=center| 3
|02/10/2010
|align=left|Foxwoods, Mashantucket, Connecticut
|align=left|
|-
|Loss
| align=center| 19-2
|align=center|Darryl Cunningham
|KO
| align=center| 3
|23/07/2010
|align=left|Royal Oak Music Theatre, Royal Oak, Michigan
|align=left|
|-
|Loss
| align=center| 14-0-1
|align=center|Caleb Truax
|UD
| align=center| 10
|11/06/2010
|align=left|St. Paul Armory, Saint Paul, Minnesota
|align=left|
|-
|Win
| align=center| 0-8-2
|align=center|Fred Thomas
|KO
| align=center| 6
|20/03/2010
|align=left|Crowne Plaza Hotel, Milwaukee, Wisconsin
|align=left|
|-
|Loss
| align=center| 29-7
|align=center|Angel Hernandez
|RTD
| align=center| 6
|21/08/2009
|align=left|Horseshoe Casino Hammond, Hammond, Indiana
|align=left|
|-
|Loss
| align=center| 10-1
|align=center|Phil Williams
|TKO
| align=center| 7
|05/06/2009
|align=left|Grand Casino, Hinckley, Minnesota
|align=left|
|-
|Loss
| align=center| 37-3-1
|align=center|Roman Karmazin
|TKO
| align=center| 7
|21/03/2009
|align=left|Playboy Mansion, Beverly Hills, California
|align=left|
|-
|Loss
| align=center| 18-1-2
|align=center|Michael Walker
|MD
| align=center| 8
|03/10/2008
|align=left|Radisson Star Plaza, Merrillville, Indiana
|align=left|
|-
|Loss
| align=center| 17-0
|align=center|Peter Quillin
|UD
| align=center| 10
|16/04/2008
|align=left|Hammerstein Ballroom, New York City
|align=left|
|-
|  Draw
| align=center| 18-0-1
|align=center|Michael Walker
|MD
| align=center| 10
|29/02/2008
|align=left|Paragon Casino & Resort, Marksville, Louisiana
|align=left|
|-
|Loss
| align=center| 18-2-1
|align=center|Fulgencio Zuniga
|UD
| align=center| 10
|23/06/2007
|align=left|Thomas & Mack Center, Las Vegas, Nevada
|align=left|
|-
|  Draw
| align=center| 29-2
|align=center|Rubin Williams
|PTS
| align=center| 12
|12/01/2007
|align=left|The Palace of Auburn Hills, Auburn Hills, Michigan
|align=left|
|-
|  Draw
| align=center| 19-4
|align=center|Mohamad Said
|MD
| align=center| 10
|05/04/2006
|align=left|New Orleans Arena, New Orleans, Louisiana
|align=left|
|-
|Loss
| align=center| 22-1
|align=center|Kingsley Ikeke
|RTD
| align=center| 10
|15/04/2005
|align=left|Northern Quest Resort & Casino, Airway Heights, Washington
|align=left|
|-
|Win
| align=center| 13-6-2
|align=center|Jameel Wilson
|TKO
| align=center| 7
|02/12/2004
|align=left|Northern Quest Resort & Casino, Airway Heights, Washington
|align=left|
|-
|Win
| align=center| 26-8-2
|align=center|Ross Thompson
|UD
| align=center| 10
|08/05/2004
|align=left|MGM Grand Garden Arena, Las Vegas, Nevada
|align=left|
|-
|Loss
| align=center| 18-1
|align=center|Anthony Mundine
|UD
| align=center| 12
|03/09/2003
|align=left|Sydney Entertainment Centre, Sydney, Australia
|align=left|
|-
|Win
| align=center| 14-8
|align=center|Richard Grant
|TKO
| align=center| 3
|03/08/2002
|align=left|Dodge Theatre, Phoenix, Arizona
|align=left|
|-
|Win
| align=center| 16-1
|align=center|Oscar Bravo
|TKO
| align=center| 1
|27/06/2002
|align=left|Santa Ana Star Casino, Bernalillo, New Mexico
|align=left|
|-
|Win
| align=center| 16-1
|align=center|Kabary Salem
|UD
| align=center| 12
|09/04/2002
|align=left|Ramada Inn, Rosemont, Illinois
|align=left|
|-
|Win
| align=center| 16-0
|align=center|Lawrence Chapman
|DQ
| align=center| 5
|21/12/2001
|align=left|Pechanga Resort and Casino, Temecula, California
|align=left|
|-
|Win
| align=center| 36-7
|align=center|Charles Brewer
|TKO
| align=center| 3
|19/05/2001
|align=left|Mohegan Sun, Uncasville, Connecticut
|align=left|
|-
|Loss
| align=center| 37-2-1
|align=center|Bernard Hopkins
|TKO
| align=center| 10
|01/12/2000
|align=left|The Venetian Las Vegas, Las Vegas, Nevada
|align=left|
|-
|Win
| align=center| 22-5-1
|align=center|Lionel Ortiz
|RTD
| align=center| 7
|05/05/2000
|align=left|Cherokee Casino, Cherokee, North Carolina
|align=left|
|-
|Win
| align=center| 26-49-1
|align=center|Anthony Ivory
|UD
| align=center| 10
|17/02/2000
|align=left|River Center, Davenport, Iowa
|align=left|
|-
|Loss
| align=center| 35-2-1
|align=center|Bernard Hopkins
|UD
| align=center| 12
|12/12/1999
|align=left|Miccosukee Resort and Gaming, Miami, Florida
|align=left|
|-
|Win
| align=center| 19-13-2
|align=center|Roland Rangel
|TKO
| align=center| 2
|22/01/1999
|align=left|Horseshoe Casino Tunica, Tunica, Mississippi
|align=left|
|-
|Win
| align=center| 16-1
|align=center|Urbano Gurrola
|TKO
| align=center| 6
|28/07/1998
|align=left|Horseshoe Casino Tunica, Tunica, Mississippi
|align=left|
|-
|Win
| align=center| 17-12
|align=center|Kevin Tillman
|TKO
| align=center| 8
|07/04/1998
|align=left|Harrah's Cherokee, Cherokee, North Carolina
|align=left|
|-
|Win
| align=center| 23-3
|align=center|Brian Barbosa
|KO
| align=center| 9
|10/02/1998
|align=left|Casino Rouge, Baton Rouge, Louisiana
|align=left|
|-
|Win
| align=center| 10-7
|align=center|Billy Robertson
|KO
| align=center| 3
|30/09/1997
|align=left|Casino Magic, Bay Saint Louis, Mississippi
|align=left|
|-
|Win
| align=center| 10-1-2
|align=center|Earl Monroe
|TKO
| align=center| 3
|27/07/1997
|align=left|Belle Casino, Baton Rouge, Louisiana
|align=left|
|-
|Win
| align=center| 14-0
|align=center|Andre Haddock
|KO
| align=center| 3
|20/05/1997
|align=left|Medieval Times, Lyndhurst, New Jersey
|align=left|
|-
|Win
| align=center| 8-8
|align=center|George Brown
|TKO
| align=center| 6
|10/05/1997
|align=left|MARK of the Quad Cities, Moline, Illinois
|align=left|
|-
|  Draw
| align=center| 21-3-2
|align=center|Eric Lucas
|PTS
| align=center| 10
|06/12/1996
|align=left|Centre Georges-Vezina, Chicoutimi, Quebec
|align=left|
|-
|Win
| align=center| 0-19
|align=center|Roy Hundley
|KO
| align=center| 2
|29/11/1996
|align=left|Sullivan Brothers Center, Waterloo, Iowa
|align=left|
|-
|Loss
| align=center| 15-0
|align=center|Chris Johnson
|MD
|10
|11/10/1996
|align=left|International Plaza Hotel, Toronto, Ontario
|align=left|
|-
|Win
| align=center| 0-8
|align=center|Eric Crumble
|TKO
| align=center| 1
|30/03/1996
|align=left|Sullivan Brothers Center, Waterloo, Iowa
|align=left|
|-
|Win
| align=center| 5-24-3
|align=center|Oscar Washington
|TKO
| align=center| 4
|09/12/1995
|align=left|MARK of the Quad Cities, Moline, Illinois
|align=left|
|-
|Win
| align=center| 9-21-2
|align=center|Marris Virgil
|TKO
| align=center| 3
|18/10/1995
|align=left|Moline, Illinois
|align=left|
|-
|Win
| align=center| 0-1
|align=center|Dan Butters
|KO
| align=center| 2
|13/05/1995
|align=left|Davenport, Iowa
|align=left|
|-
|Win
| align=center| 9-4
|align=center|Abdullah Ramadan
|KO
| align=center| 2
|01/03/1995
|align=left|Fort Lauderdale Memorial Auditorium, Fort Lauderdale, Florida
|align=left|
|-
|Win
| align=center| 2-1
|align=center|Edgar Borja
|KO
| align=center| 2
|17/12/1994
|align=left|Ruminahui Coliseum, Quito
|align=left|
|-
|Win
| align=center| 7-4-1
|align=center|Joe Harris
|KO
| align=center| 3
|22/10/1994
|align=left|Davenport, Iowa
|align=left|
|-
|Win
| align=center| 4-15
|align=center|Willie Perry
|KO
| align=center| 6
|08/10/1994
|align=left|Sterling, Illinois
|align=left|
|-
|Win
| align=center| 4-15
|align=center|Tyrone Mack
|TKO
| align=center| 2
|31/07/1994
|align=left|Des Moines, Iowa
|align=left|
|-
|Win
| align=center| 10-12
|align=center|Hector Ramirez
|KO
| align=center| 3
|01/07/1994
|align=left|Davenport, Iowa
|align=left|
|-
|Win
| align=center| 0-10
|align=center|Leon Shavers
|KO
| align=center| 1
|08/01/1994
|align=left|Davenport, Iowa
|align=left|
|-
|Win
| align=center| --
|align=center|Clifton Woods
|TKO
| align=center| 1
|23/10/1993
|align=left|St. Joseph Civic Arena, Saint Joseph, Missouri
|align=left|
|-
|Win
| align=center| 3-14
|align=center|Donald Tucker
|KO
| align=center| 1
|31/07/1993
|align=left|Davenport, Iowa
|align=left|
|-
|Loss
| align=center| 11-13
|align=center|Anthony Ivory
|KO
| align=center| 1
|22/05/1993
|align=left|Davenport, Iowa
|align=left|
|}

Outside the ring
On July 30, 2007 in Davenport, Iowa, Echols was shot in the leg while trying to break up a fight.

In 2013, when asked how many children he has, he replied "Twenty-three, I think," admitting it could be more. At the time, he was living with his fiancee and four children in Dade City, Florida.

References

External links
 
Detailed Bio

1971 births
Living people
Sportspeople from Memphis, Tennessee
Sportspeople from Davenport, Iowa
Boxers from Tennessee
Boxers from Iowa
American male boxers
African-American boxers
Super-middleweight boxers
Middleweight boxers
21st-century African-American sportspeople
20th-century African-American sportspeople